Spanish music may refer to:

Music of Spain, music of the Spanish people in Spain
Latin music, though note that not all Latin music are in Spanish

Spanish music may also refer to the music of Spanish-speaking countries:
Music of Argentina
Music of Bolivia
Music of Chile
Music of Costa Rica
Music of Cuba
Music of Colombia
Music of the Dominican Republic
Music of Ecuador
Music of El Salvador
Music of Equatorial Guinea
Music of Guatemala
Music of Honduras
Music of Mexico
Music of Nicaragua
Music of Panama
Music of Paraguay
Music of Peru
Music of Puerto Rico
Music of Venezuela
Music of Uruguay